A Cinema Girl's Romance is a 1915 British silent drama film directed by George Pearson and starring Agnes Glynne, Fred Paul and Alice De Winton. It was based on a novel by Ladbroke Black. The film was made at Isleworth Studios.

Cast
 Agnes Glynne as Hazel Wilmot  
 Fred Paul as Sir Robert Loftus 
 Alice De Winton as Ruth Roland  
 Bernard Vaughan 
 Donald Young

References

Bibliography
 Harris, Ed. Britain's Forgotten Film Factory: The Story of Isleworth Studios. Amberley Publishing, 2013.

External links

1915 films
1915 drama films
British drama films
British silent feature films
1910s English-language films
Films directed by George Pearson
Films set in England
Films shot at Isleworth Studios
British black-and-white films
1910s British films
Silent drama films